The DeMarco–Becket Memorial Trophy is a Canadian Football League trophy. It is awarded originally to the player selected as the outstanding lineman in the West Division.

The trophy was donated by the families of Mel Becket and Mario DeMarco, who were two prominent Saskatchewan Roughriders players who were victims of the Mount Slesse aircraft disaster on December 9, 1956.

Since 1974 this trophy has been awarded to the Most Outstanding Offensive Lineman in the West Division. Either the winner of this trophy or the winner of the Leo Dandurand Trophy will also receive the Canadian Football League Most Outstanding Offensive Lineman Award.

Prior to 1974 the CFL's Most Outstanding Lineman Award was awarded to both outstanding defensive players and outstanding linemen in the West Division, and this award was different from the DeMarco–Becket Memorial Trophy.

In 1995, during the American Expansion, this trophy was given to the North Division's Most Outstanding Lineman.

DeMarco-Becket Memorial Trophy winners

2022 – Stanley Bryant (OT), Winnipeg Blue Bombers
2021 – Stanley Bryant (OT), Winnipeg Blue Bombers
2020 – season cancelled - covid 19
 2019 - Stanley Bryant, (OT), Winnipeg Blue Bombers
 2018 - Stanley Bryant, (OT), Winnipeg Blue Bombers
 2017 - Stanley Bryant, (OT), Winnipeg Blue Bombers
 2016 - Derek Dennis, (OT), Calgary Stampeders
 2015 - Jovan Olafioye (OT), BC Lions
 2014 - Brett Jones (C), Calgary Stampeders
 2013 - Brendon LaBatte (OG), Saskatchewan Roughriders
 2012 - Jovan Olafioye (OT), BC Lions
 2011 - Jovan Olafioye (OT), BC Lions
 2010 - Ben Archibald (OT), Calgary Stampeders
 2009 - Ben Archibald (OT), Calgary Stampeders
 2008 - Gene Makowsky (OT), Saskatchewan Roughriders
 2007 - Rob Murphy (OG), BC Lions
 2006 - Rob Murphy (OG), BC Lions
 2005 - Gene Makowsky (OT), Saskatchewan Roughriders
 2004 - Gene Makowsky (OT), Saskatchewan Roughriders
 2003 - Andrew Greene (OG), Saskatchewan Roughriders
 2002 - Bruce Beaton (OT), Edmonton Eskimos
 2001 - Jay McNeil (OG), Calgary Stampeders
 2000 - Andrew Greene (OG), Saskatchewan Roughriders
 1999 - Jamie Taras (C), BC Lions
 1998 - Fred Childress (OG), Calgary Stampeders
 1997 - Fred Childress (OG), Calgary Stampeders
 1996 - Rocco Romano (OG), Calgary Stampeders
 1995 - Jamie Taras (OG), BC Lions
 1994 - Rocco Romano (OG), Calgary Stampeders
 1993 - Bruce Covernton (OT), Calgary Stampeders
 1992 - Vic Stevenson (OT), Saskatchewan Roughriders
 1991 - Jim Mills (OT), BC Lions
 1990 - Jim Mills (OT), BC Lions
 1989 - Rod Connop (C), Edmonton Eskimos
 1988 - Roger Aldag (OG), Saskatchewan Roughriders
 1987 - Bob Poley (C), Calgary Stampeders
 1986 - Roger Aldag (OG), Saskatchewan Roughriders
 1985 - Nick Bastaja (OT), Winnipeg Blue Bombers
 1984 - John Bonk (C), Winnipeg Blue Bombers
 1983 - John Bonk (C), Winnipeg Blue Bombers
 1982 - Lloyd Fairbanks (OT), Calgary Stampeders
 1981 - Larry Butler (OG), Winnipeg Blue Bombers
 1980 - Mike Wilson (OT), Edmonton Eskimos
 1979 - Mike Wilson (OT), Edmonton Eskimos
 1978 - Al Wilson (C), BC Lions
 1977 - Al Wilson (C), BC Lions
 1976 - Al Wilson (C), BC Lions
 1975 - Charlie Turner (OT), Edmonton Eskimos
 1974 - Curtis Wester (OG), BC Lions
 1973 - Ray Nettles (LB), BC Lions
 1972 - John Helton (DT), Calgary Stampeders
 1971 - Wayne Harris (LB), Calgary Stampeders
 1970 - Greg Pipes (DT), Edmonton Eskimos
 1969 - Ed McQuarters (DT), Saskatchewan Roughriders
 1968 - Ed McQuarters (DT), Saskatchewan Roughriders
 1967 - John LaGrone (DT), Edmonton Eskimos
 1966 - Wayne Harris (LB), Calgary Stampeders
 1965 - Dick Fouts (DE), BC Lions
 1964 - Tom Brown (MG), BC Lions
 1963 - Tom Brown (LB), BC Lions
 1962 - Tom Brown (LB), BC Lions
 1961 - Frank Rigney (OT), Winnipeg Blue Bombers
 1960 - Frank Rigney (OT), Winnipeg Blue Bombers
 1959 - Art Walker (DT), Edmonton Eskimos
 1958 - Don Luzzi (DT), Calgary Stampeders
 1957 - Art Walker (DE), Edmonton Eskimos

CFL's Most Outstanding Lineman Award in the West Division prior to the 1974

1973 - Ray Nettles (LB), British Columbia Lions
1972 - John Helton (DT), Calgary Stampeders
1971 - Wayne Harris (LB), Calgary Stampeders
1970 - Wayne Harris (LB), Calgary Stampeders
1969 - John LaGrone (DT), Edmonton Eskimos
1968 - Ted Urness (C), Saskatchewan Roughriders
1967 - Ed McQuarters (DT), Saskatchewan Roughriders
1966 - Wayne Harris (LB), Calgary Stampeders
1965 - Wayne Harris (LB), Calgary Stampeders
1964 - Tom Brown (LB), British Columbia Lions

1963 - Tom Brown (LB), British Columbia Lions
1962 - Wayne Harris (LB), Calgary Stampeders
1961 - Frank Rigney (OT), Winnipeg Blue Bombers
1960 - Herb Gray (DE), Winnipeg Blue Bombers
1959 - Roger Nelson (OT), Edmonton Eskimos
1958 - Don Luzzi (DT), Calgary Stampeders
1957 - Art Walker (OT/DG), Edmonton Eskimos
1956 - Buddy Alliston (LB/OG), Winnipeg Blue Bombers
1955 - Martin Ruby, Saskatchewan & Dale Meinert, Edmonton

References
CFL Publications: 2011 Facts, Figures & Records

Canadian Football League trophies and awards